The Foundation Insurance Test (FIT) is an insurance qualification in the United Kingdom. The Foundation Insurance Test is considered an entry-level qualification for those beginning insurance careers and is usually taken before advancing to more demanding examinations such as the CII exams. The exam is multiple choice and in 2012 the exam had a pass rate of 78.43%. A nominal pass mark is set at 70% although the actual pass mark may vary.

The test covers several areas of insurance:

Understanding how the insurance market operates
Understanding risk and insurance in the context of the insurance market
Understanding agency and insurance legal principles
Understanding insurance and underwriting procedures
Understanding policy wordings and procedures for renewals
Understanding insurance procedures for claims
Understanding the conduct of insurance business
Understanding personal insurance
Understanding commercial insurance

See also
Certificate of Insurance

References

External links
Syllabus 
Application form

Examinations
Insurance in the United Kingdom